Cristiano Rojas (1950-2018) was a Wichí Anglican Suffragan Bishop in Northern Argentina.

Duarte was born in El Yuto. He was a school teacher as well as a priest. He died on 10 September 2018.

References

1950 births
2018 deaths
Argentine Anglicans
Anglican bishops of Northern Argentina
21st-century Anglican bishops in South America
Argentine people of indigenous peoples descent